9936 Al-Biruni, provisional designation , is a carbonaceous asteroid from the outer region of the asteroid belt, approximately 24 kilometers in diameter. It was discovered on 8 August 1986, by Belgian and Bulgarian astronomers Eric Elst and Violeta Ivanova at the Rozhen Observatory, located in Bulgaria's Smolyan province near the border to Greece. It was named for Persian medieval scholar Al-Biruni.

Orbit and classification 

Al-Biruni orbits the Sun in the outer main-belt at a distance of 2.5–3.7 AU once every 5 years and 5 months (1,976 days). Its orbit has an eccentricity of 0.19 and an inclination of 15° with respect to the ecliptic.

Lightcurve 

A rotational lightcurve of Al-Biruni was obtained from photometric observations made at the U.S. Goodsell Observatory, Minnesota, in August 2002. The lightcurve gave a rotation period of  hours with a brightness amplitude of 0.14 in magnitude

Diameter and albedo 

According to the space-based surveys carried out by the Japanese Akari satellite and the NEOWISE mission of NASA's Wide-field Infrared Survey Explorer, Al-Biruni measures between 23.9 and 27.8 kilometers in diameter, and its surface has a corresponding albedo of 0.048 to 0.065. The Collaborative Asteroid Lightcurve Link assumes a standard albedo for carbonaceous asteroids of 0.057 and calculates a diameter of 22.2 kilometers with an absolute magnitude of 12.0.

Naming 

The minor planet was named after the Persian scholar and polymath Al-Biruni (973–1048). Regarded as the founder of Indology and the father of geodesy, he made important contributions to anthropology, mathematics and astronomy. In particular, he is known for developing a method for the summation of series, for solving algebraic equations, and for the triangulation of distances on Earth's surface. The official naming citation was published by the Minor Planet Center on 26 September 2007. The lunar crater Al-Biruni is also named in his honour.

References

External links 
 Rozhen Observatory, Smolyan, Bulgaria
 Asteroid Lightcurve Database (LCDB), query form (info )
 Dictionary of Minor Planet Names, Google books
 Asteroids and comets rotation curves, CdR – Observatoire de Genève, Raoul Behrend
 Discovery Circumstances: Numbered Minor Planets (5001)-(10000) – Minor Planet Center
 
 

009936
Discoveries by Eric Walter Elst
Discoveries by Violeta G. Ivanova
Named minor planets
19860808